Kim Bảng is a rural district of Hà Nam province in the Red River Delta region of Vietnam. As of 2003 the district had a population of 129,227. The district covers an area of 184 km². The district capital lies at Quế.

References

Districts of Hà Nam province